Jo Heng (19609 January 2020), also known as Xing Zenghua, was a Singaporean lyricist. She died from lymphoma, a type of blood cancer, on 9 January 2020 at the age of 59.

Personal life 
Heng studied in Bukit Panjang Government High School and Thomson Secondary School, and focused on Chinese composition.. She worked in factories before joining Xin He Magazine.

Career 
She also wrote the lyrics for Andy Lau's "The Path Winds Through High Peaks" which was released in 1994.

References

Singaporean songwriters
1960 births
2020 deaths